This is a list of banks in Rwanda

 Commercial banks

 Guaranty Trust Bank (Rwanda) plc - commonly referred to as GTBank Rwanda
Bank of Kigali
 I&M Bank (Rwanda) - Formerly Commercial Bank of Rwanda (BCR)
 Compagnie Générale de Banque (Cogebanque)
 Equity Bank Rwanda Limited
 Ecobank Rwanda
 BPR Bank Rwanda Plc (a subsidiary of KCB Group).
Access Bank Rwanda
 NCBA Bank Rwanda
Urwego Bank
 Microfinance banks
AB Bank Rwanda
Unguka Bank

 Development banks
 Development Bank of Rwanda (BRD) - Owns 100% of Housing Bank of Rwanda (Banque de l'Habitat du Rwanda) (BHR)

 Cooperative banks
 Zigama CSS.
 Co-operative Bank Rwanda (In development)

See also

 List of banks in Africa
 National Bank of Rwanda
 Economy of Rwanda

References

External links
 Website of National Bank of Rwanda
 Total Bank Assets of RWF:1,943.32 Trillion (US$2.849.36 Billion) In March 2013 

 
Banks
Rwanda
Rwanda